Joselito Duncil (born January 13, 1983) is a Filipino former professional basketball player who last played for the Navotas Uni-Pak Sardines of the Maharlika Pilipinas Basketball League (MPBL). He was drafted 15th overall by Red Bull in 2007. Duncil previously played for the University of Santo Tomas Growling Tigers from 2004 to 2006 in the UAAP where he helped UST win their first championship since 1996 in his final year as a Tiger, winning the Finals MVP award in the process.

Amateur career
Born in San Pablo City, Laguna, Philippines, Duncil first played for the Aivandale selection in San Pablo City, Laguna alongside some notable players like Dexter Mendoza, Alvin Garcia, Richard Manlapig and Christian Anlacan. He then played for University of Santo Tomas Growling Tigers in 2004. The Tigers failed to make it to the playoffs in Duncil's first year, with him playing a minor role in the rotation. In 2005, the Tigers again missed the playoffs, having an even worse record than the previous year. Duncil emerged as a backup for Warren de Guzman and Danny Pribhdas, becoming the third option for the team.

In 2006 Duncil and new player Jervy Cruz emerged as the go-to guys for the Tigers as they barely made it to the playoffs, scoring 20 points or more in three of their first four games. Duncil himself missed four games either due to suspension or illness. In the playoff for the third seed, Duncil scored 13 points against the Adamson Falcons to help UST clinch the #3 seed and set up a semifinal series against the UE Red Warriors who had the twice to beat advantage. In the semifinals, Duncil scored 13 points to help UST force a do-or-die game for the last Finals berth. Duncil completed a pivotal three-point play in the dying seconds of the do-or-die game off Cruz's missed shot to put UST up for good and enter the Finals for the first time since 1999.

In Game 1 of the finals, Duncil had a cold night with 9 points as the top seed Ateneo Blue Eagles squeaked past the Tigers with a buzzer-beater lay-up by Doug Kramer to seize a 1-0 series lead. In Game 2, Duncil scored 20 points as UST blew out Ateneo to set up the winner-take-all game 3. In that game, Duncil top-scored for the Growling Tigers with 18 points, helping the Tigers cope up with Jervy Cruz fouling out at the end of the fourth quarter in the overtime. For his efforts, Duncil was named as the UAAP Finals MVP.

Duncil was supposed to suit up for the Tigers in his final year of eligibility in 2007 but it was revealed that Duncil has a birth certificate certifying him that he was born on January 13, 1982, causing him to be ineligible for 2007, since UAAP rules only allow people under 25 years old to play. Duncil previously submitted a birth certificate to both the league and UST saying he was born in 1983. This caused UST to drop him from the 2007 lineup, and Duncil signed up for the 2007 PBA Draft.

Duncil revealed that he was really born in 1983, but when the original copy from the Apalit, Pampanga civil registrar was lost, the new document showed a wrong year of birth. Duncil initiated court proceedings to correct the error in Apalit.

Player profile
Duncil's strengths are known to be his outside shooting and work ethic.

He was the only draft pick of Red Bull in the 2007 PBA Draft, especially the only draft pick from the 2006 UST Growling Tigers championship team.

In the offseason, he was signed by the Petron Blaze Boosters. He helped the Boosters win the 2011 PBA Governors Cup over Talk 'N Text, stopping the latter's attempt for a Grand Slam. He got traded back to the Boosters in exchange for Wynne Arboleda.

References

External links
Player Profile
PBA-Online Profile

1983 births
Living people
UST Growling Tigers basketball players
Filipino men's basketball players
People from San Pablo, Laguna
Basketball players from Laguna (province)
Point guards
Shooting guards
Barako Bull Energy Boosters players
San Miguel Beermen players
Air21 Express players
Barako Bull Energy players
NorthPort Batang Pier players
Maharlika Pilipinas Basketball League players
Barako Bull Energy Boosters draft picks